Reyon Kay (born 10 December 1986) is a New Zealand speed skater. He made his Olympic debut competing for  New Zealand at the 2018 Winter Olympics.

He started with inline skating but transferred to speed skating in 2010 because he wanted to compete at the Winter Olympics.

He was the 2012 and 2016 Sportsperson of the Year in Kapiti, New Zealand.

References

External links
 
 

1986 births
New Zealand male speed skaters
Speed skaters at the 2018 Winter Olympics
Olympic speed skaters of New Zealand
Living people